Haplogroup R1a is one of the major classifications (called clades) of Y-chromosome types found in human male lines. It is widespread all across Eurasia. Many sample studies therefore carry information on the incidence of R1a and/or its subclassifications, in particular the dominant branching line represented by the haplogroups R1a1 and R1a1a.

The table below collates information from a number of such sample studies, with incidence frequencies in sample data reported as percentages, along with the associated sample sizes.

Data

Notes

References

 
.

.

 in K. Boyle, C. Renfrew, and M. Levine, eds. Ancient interactions: east and west in Eurasia. McDonald Institute for Archaeological Research Monograph Series, Cambridge University Press, Cambridge

.

.
.
.

.

.

.

.

R1